Balaji Mohan (born 25 May 1987) is an Indian filmmaker and actor in Tamil-language films. After discontinuing his engineering studies to pursue his passion and become a director, he enrolled at a film academy and attended courses and workshops, besides participating in short film contests. After shooting more than half-a-dozen short films, he directed his first full-length bilingual film romantic comedy Kadhalil Sodhappuvadhu Yeppadi (Tamil) based on one of his own short films.

Early life
Balaji was born on 25 May 1987 in Tiruchirappalli. He pursued his schooling in Campion Anglo-Indian Higher Secondary School, Tiruchirappalli, and later joined the Sri Sivasubramaniya Nadar College of Engineering in Chennai for his higher studies, albeit he had decided in 10th class already that he wanted to become a director. He recalls that his parents bought him a handycam in his third semester, and he made his first short film called Velicham, which was also sent to film festivals and won. Although he had initially planned to complete his education before following his passion and pursuing a career in filmmaking, he did not want to "wait for too long" after making Velicham. After convincing his parents, he discontinued his engineering course two years later and went on to join the L. V. Prasad Film and TV Academy in Vadapalani, Chennai to learn editing and sound design. He also studied acting at Alchemy Institute, Adyar, Chennai.

Personal life
Balaji Mohan got married in June 2012 to Aruna. In 2013 January, Balaji announced his divorce due to irreconcilable differences. In January of 2022, he married Dhanya Balakrishna.

Career
Balaji began his career as an assistant director for the Tamil film called Kulir 100° (2009). While the film was in its pre-production stage, he got the opportunity to join the Gateway to Hollywood, a show that was aired in Sony TV. His short film Treasure was featured in the contest and Balaji became one of the 6 finalists of the show. He later joined as an assistant director for Sudha K. Prasad's Tamil film Drohi (2010), while simultaneously participating in Kalaignar TV's first season of Naalaya Iyakunar. He directed five short films namely Kodi, The Juniors, Addi Tail, Mittai Veedu and Kadhalil Sodhappuvadhu Yeppadi for the show and was one of the winners of the series award for consistent performance.

Among his works, Kadhalil Sodhappuvadhu Yeppadi was most popular and went viral on YouTube, garnering overwhelming response. Cinematographer Nirav Shah saw the short film and initiated the idea to make it into a full-length feature film. Balaji took three months to develop the script, while Nirav Shah reached out to producers and actors, introducing him to producer Sashikanth of YNot Movies. Siddharth, who too was keen on turning the short film into a feature film after he had seen it, entered the project, playing the lead role besides co-producing the venture. The film was made as a bilingual in Tamil and Telugu; while the original title was given for the Tamil version, the Telugu version was named Love Failure, with the cast and crew being retained for both versions. The project was completed in a record 36 days, and both versions of the film were released simultaneously in February 2012 in Tamil Nadu and Andhra Pradesh, respectively. Opening to highly positive critical response, the film went on to become a sleeper hit in both states.

Balaji Mohan collaborated with Dulquer Salmaan for his second directorial venture, a bilingual titled Vaayai Moodi Pesavum in Tamil and Samsaaram Aarogyathinu Haanikaram in Malayalam. The film marked Balaji Mohan's debut in Malayalam cinema and Dulquer Salmaan's debut in Tamil cinema. His third film was Maari, starring Dhanush and it released in July, 2015. Next up he will be teaming up with Actor Dhanush again for Maari 2 a sequel to Maari.

He then produced, written and directed a web series titled As I'm Suffering From Kadhal, in which he also played an important role. The series was made in Tamil and dubbed in Telugu. It was released in Hotstar Originals on 15 June 2017.

Filmography

Feature films

As actor

As producer

Web series

References

External links
 

1987 births
Living people
Telugu film directors
Tamil film directors
Screenwriters from Tamil Nadu
Artists from Tiruchirappalli
Male actors in Tamil cinema
Malayalam film directors
21st-century Indian film directors
Film directors from Tamil Nadu
21st-century Indian male actors